MV Loch Dunvegan is a Caledonian Maritime Assets Limited car ferry built for the Isle of Skye crossing and now operating in the Kyles of Bute, Argyll and Bute, Scotland. She is operated by Caledonian MacBrayne.

History
Loch Dunvegan entered service at Kyle of Lochalsh on 13 May 1991, displacing . Even at this time, it was known that the Skye Bridge was coming. On 16 October 1995, Loch Dunvegan and Loch Fyne, dressed with flags, gave the last ever car ferry runs across this narrow stretch of water. Loch Dunvegan was laid up in James Watt Dock at Greenock for two years. No sale was completed and in 1997, CalMac prepared the vessels for service once more. In August, Loch Dunvegan went to relieve the new , which had suffered a major breakdown at Lochaline on the Sound of Mull. Breaking down herself, she was relieved on 27 September 1997 by Loch Fyne, which went on to become the permanent vessel on Mull's secondary crossing. Since 1999, Loch Dunvegan has been the main vessel on the five-minute run from Colintraive to Rhubodach.

Layout
Loch Dunvegan and her twin sister, both built for the Skye route, were loosely based on the earlier . Passenger accommodation along the starboard side of the hull can cater for up to 250 persons, with lounges on two levels and an open deck above. The car deck has four lanes and can take 36 cars. The high sided design is prone to being caught by the wind. She initially had very wide ramps at both ends. Initially lengthened to reduce the risk of long vehicles grounding, these have been replaced by narrower and lighter ramps.

Service
Loch Dunvegan and  provided a 24-hour service between Kyle of Lochalsh and Kyleakin on Skye until 1995. Two years layup followed, after which Loch Dunvegan was employed on relief duties, seeing service at Mallaig, Fishnish (relieving her sister) and providing a passenger-only service on the Wemyss Bay - Rothesay route. In July 1998, she provided an emergency service between Portavadie and Tarbert while the main Kintyre road was closed due to a landslide.

Due to her size relative to the short crossing of  she normally sails with both ramps unfolded.

References

External links
MV Loch Dunvegan on www.calmac.co.uk

Caledonian MacBrayne
1991 ships
Ships built on the River Clyde